Life on the Mississippi is a made-for-television feature film, based loosely on the 1883 book of the same title by Mark Twain. It was directed by Peter H. Hunt, and starred David Knell as the young Mark Twain and Robert Lansing as his teacher, Horace Bixby. Marcy Walker, who later appeared on All My Children,  played a character named Emmeline.  It aired in 1980 as part of the PBS series, Great Performances, and was released for home video in 1984 by MCA Entertainment.
It was the first in a group of films directed by Hunt based on Twain's work.

References

External links
 IMDb entry
 WorldCat entry
 View on Archive.org

Films based on works by Mark Twain
1980 television films
1980 films
1980s adventure films
American television films
Films directed by Peter H. Hunt
Works about the Mississippi River
Television shows based on works by Mark Twain